Henry Harcourt Hyde Clarke, known as Hyde Clarke, (14 December 1815 – 1 March 1895) was an English engineer, philologist and author.

The son of Henry and Susannah Clarke, he was born at Little Bell Alley, Barbican in London. He edited the Railway Register from 1845 to 1847 and founded the London and County Bank. He was a member of the British Association for the Advancement of Science. He was expelled from the Anthropological Society of London on 22 August 1868 in the wake of public allegations he had made concerning (chiefly) the mismanagement of accounts of that body. He was elected a Fellow of the Royal Statistical Society on 19 December 1876.

He corresponded with Charles Darwin

Family
He married Maria Mildred Eaton, with one son one daughter:
 Henry Harcourt Hyde Clarke (29 May 1852 - 1906)
 Edgiva Mildred Harcourt Hyde Clarke (23 August 1854 - 1918)

Maria died at their home, 32 St George's Square, Mayfair, London, in 1892 aged 71. He died at their home on 1 March 1895, aged 79.

Principal works 
 Physical economy a preliminary inquiry into the physical laws governing the periods of famines and panics. 1847
 Life of Richard Trevithick, C.E.; Life of George Stephenson, C.E. 1848
Contributions to railway statistics in 1846, 1847, & 1848 1849
A grammar of the English tongue, spoken and written; for self-teaching and for schools. 1859
Memoir of the comparative grammar of Egyptian, Coptic & Ude 1873
Researches in prehistoric and protohistoric comparative philology, mythology, and archæology, in connection with the origin of culture in America and the Accad or Sumerian families. 1875
The Khita and Khita-Peruvian epoch: Khita, Hamath, Hittite, Canaanite, Etruscan, Peruvian, Mexican, etc. 1877
Himalayan Origin and Connection of the Magyar and Ugrian. 1877
A short handbook of the comparative philology of the English, Anglo-Saxon, Frisian, Flemish or Dutch, Low or Platt Dutch, High Dutch or German, Danish, Swedish, Icelandic, Latin, Italian, French, Spanish, and Portuguese tongues. 1879
The early history of the Mediterranean populations, &c., in their migrations and settlements : illustrated from Autonomous Coins, Gems, Inscriptions, &C. 1882
Examination of the Legend of Atlantis in Reference to Protohistoric Communication with America, London, 1886

References 

Clarke,Hyde. The Century Cyclopedia of Names: A Pronouncing and Etymological Dictionary of Names in Geography, Biography, Mythology, History, Ethnology, Art, Archæology, Fiction, Etc. New York: Century Co, 1904.
 worldcat.org Accessed April 2, 2007

External links 
For a note about Hyde Clarke "Sunspots and Expectations" of the Economics of W.S. Jevons by Sandra Peart Google books.com

1815 births
1895 deaths
English philologists
Fellows of the Ethnological Society of London
Fellows of the Royal Statistical Society